Münchner Freiheit is a Munich U-Bahn interchange station in the Munich borough of Schwabing-Freimann. Here, the U3 and U6 subway lines part, with U3 continuing west towards Scheidplatz and U6 continuing north towards Freimann. The station serves as a major interchange for northern Munich.

Underground, the station consists of two island platforms, each servicing two tracks.

On the surface, a bus and tram terminal is located on the corner of Leopoldstraße and Feilitschstraße. This is the southern terminus of route  of the Munich tramway, which opened in 2009 and continues north towards the Parkstadt Schwabing office and residential development.

Name 
The station is named after the eponymous square located on the eastern side of Leopoldstraße. Before the renovation in 2009, the name had the old spelling: Münchener Freiheit. The spelling was changed to omit the extra letter 'e' in Münchner.

References

External links

Munich U-Bahn stations
Railway stations in Germany opened in 1972
1972 establishments in West Germany